Wari Sipitaña (Aymara wari vicuña, sipitaña hunting with a lasso,  "vicuña hunting with a lasso", Hispanicized spellings Huarisepitana, Huarisepitaña) is a   mountain in the Cordillera Real in the Andes of Bolivia. It lies in the La Paz Department, Los Andes Province, Batallas Municipality. Wari Sipitaña is situated south of  Patapatani and Jach'a T'uxu, southwest of Wari Umaña, northwest of Jach'a Qullu and Jach'a Juqhu and southeast of Wila Wilani.

References 

Mountains of La Paz Department (Bolivia)